The Jedi Hunter is a fan film that made its debut on the internet on August 30, 2002, created by fans of the Star Wars franchise. It is a spoof of Star Wars and The Crocodile Hunter, with Boba Fett sliding into the Steve Irwin role, hunting Jedi along with his wife "Terri Fett".

While the film primarily spoofs the Star Wars universe in the format of a Crocodile Hunter special, there are several other notable targets, including swipes at Army of Darkness, "Crocodile" Dundee, Star Trek, Shaft, The Princess Bride, and Aliens. The film starts with a quick series of faux channel changes, opening with a cameo appearance by Crazy Watto and continuing with Star Wars versions of Cheers and The Six Million Dollar Man.

The film bears the odd credit "Special Thanks to Peter Mayhew for giving us the inspiration – that's right, blame the Wookiee!" According to Star Wars Insider, this credit is due to a missed dinner engagement with the Star Wars actor, which led the filmmakers to amuse themselves while waiting for him, eventually hitting upon the idea that became this film. They good-naturedly credit his not appearing at dinner with kick-starting the film.

The film has played at many film festivals, and proven popular with Star Wars fans, winning several awards, including Best Visual Effects at the 2003 Dahlonega International Film Festival, and the Audience Choice Award in the Lucasfilm-sponsored 2003 Official Star Wars Fan Film Awards. In August 2010, Time magazine listed it as one of the Top 10 Star Wars fanfilms.

Notes

External links
 
 Official Site – News, behind-the-scenes info, and more
 The Jedi Hunter at Atomfilms 
 Jedi Hunter review at Film Threat

2002 films
Fan films based on Star Wars
American independent films
2002 independent films
2002 science fiction films
2000s English-language films
2000s American films